Knut Martin Stjerna (14 March 1874 – 15 November 1909) was a Swedish archaeologist and scholar, notable for a number of papers analyzing Beowulf from an archaeological perspective. He was a lecturer at Uppsala University, where he taught, among others, Birger Nerman and Sune Lindqvist.

Early life and education
Knut Stjerna was born on 14 March 1874 in Malmö, Sweden, to Johan Stjerna and Matilda Johanna Grönlund. He studied at Lund University under Henrik Schück, focusing on the history of art and literature, and in 1898 published his first major independent work, Erik den helige: en sagohistorisk studie ("Erik the Holy: a sago-historical study"). The death of his father forced Stjerna to find employment at the newspaper Sydsvenskan to support his family, while continuing his studies at the university. He switched however to studying archaeology, in part because of the resistance he was met with for his "hypercritical" method of analysing legendary stories. In 1905, he obtained his Ph.D.

Career
Stjerna began teaching at Uppsala University in 1906, sharing responsibilities with Oscar Almgren, and took on a full-time position as lecturer in Scandinavian and Comparative Archaeology in 1907. That same year he undertook a major archaeological excavation in Uppsala with his students, after construction in the city uncovered the remains of medieval buildings. Stjerna's students at the university included Sune Lindqvist and Birger Nerman.

Between 1903 and 1908 Stjerna published a number of articles about the Anglo-Saxon epic poem Beowulf. In 1912 they were translated into English by John Richard Clark Hall, who was also responsible for several early translations of the poem. Stjerna's articles were credited with "providing a most welcome addition to the critical apparatus of the poem", by supplementing the meagre historical record with observations gleaned from archaeological research.

Personal life
By 1908 Stjerna's health was deteriorating, and in December he was admitted to the hospital with heart arrhythmia. He was discharged in March and resumed teaching, but died in November at the age of 35.

Publications
Stjerna published at least 23 works, several posthumous, between 1898 and 1911. They are listed on pages 265–266 of Hall's 1912 translation of Stjerna's works.
  
  
 Follow-up published as  
  
  
 Translated in 
  
  
 Translated in 
  
 Translated in 
  
  
 Translated in

References

Bibliography
  
  
  
 
  
 
  

Swedish archaeologists
1874 births
1909 deaths